Lygodactylus petteri, Petter’s dwarf gecko, is a species of gecko endemic to Madagascar.

References

Lygodactylus
Reptiles described in 1967
Endemic fauna of Madagascar